The 2006 Family Values Tour was a summer concert tour headlined by Korn. The tour originally started in 1998.

Overview
Although originally conceived as an annual tour, the Family Values Tour returned in 2006 after a five-year hiatus.

The 2006 tour featured a total of ten bands across two separate stages, with Californian rockers Droid appearing on a number of shows. Korn, the creators of the tour, headlined the 2006 show with the Deftones as co-headliners. 
 
On July 30, at the tour's stop in Atlanta, a fan was severely beaten over a baseball cap by another concert-goer during the Deftones' set. The victim, 30-year-old local man Andy Richardson, later died as a result of his injuries in the Grady Memorial Hospital.

The defendant, 25-year-old Michael Scott Axley, pleaded guilty to involuntary manslaughter and aggravated assault and was sentenced to 10 years incarceration and 10 years probation. "All the bands on the Family Values Tour offer their sincerest condolences and prayers to the family of 30-year-old Andy Richardson", read an official statement from Korn.

KoRn shot the video for their third "See You on the Other Side" single, "Politics" in East Troy, Wisconsin, putting handheld cameras in the hands of ten lucky members of its fanclub and local area fans who were given all-access passes to shoot the performance and any behind-the-scenes footage that they chose, along with the traditional camera shoot.

More than 400,000 wildly enthusiastic fans turned out for the Family Values Tour for the 30-show city trek.

Two shows during the tour were canceled. One in Wantagh, New York was forced to cancel due to terrible weather that hit the area, flooding the entire floor of the Jones Beach Theater. The second cancelled show was in Virginia Beach, Virginia for undisclosed reasons.

The tour also featured many surprises for fans with special on-stage appearances from Slipknot bassist Paul Gray & Filter frontman Richard Patrick performing "Hey Man, Nice Shot", as well as a U2 cover of "Pride (In the Name of Love)", with Flyleaf which appeared on the Family Values 2006 CD, Deftones frontman Chino Moreno performing "Wicked" and Slipknot/Stone Sour lead singer Corey Taylor joining KoRn on stage for a rendition of "Freak on a Leash".

KoRn bassist Reginald "Fieldy" Arvizu was also forced to jump in for guitarist James "Munky" Shaffer during the band's closing song, "Blind" in Holmdel, New Jersey after he was reportedly drunk and had to leave the stage.

Official lineup
 Korn (headliner)
 Deftones (co-headliner)
 Stone Sour
 Flyleaf (missed show in The Woodlands due to 94.1 JJO Band Camp show)
 Dir en grey (missed first three shows)
 10 Years
 Deadsy (missed show in The Woodlands due to Lollapalooza 2006 show)
 Bury Your Dead
 Bullets and Octane
 Walls of Jericho (started 15th August)
 Droid (select dates)
 Unseen Vision (select dates)
 Sekond Skyn (select dates)

Setlists

Korn

On the 2006 Family Values Tour, Korn played almost the same songs at every stop of the tour, except for some songs played in different places, such as Politics and Twist. The set list was, usually:

Right Now
Twist
Love Song
A.D.I.D.A.S.
Thoughtless
Falling Away from Me
Coming Undone
Got the Life
Throw Me Away
Shoots and Ladders
Wicked
Politics
Here to Stay
Freak on a Leash

Encore
Hollow Life (Acoustic)
Twisted Transistor
Y'All Want a Single?
Blind

Deftones

Passenger
My Own Summer
Beware
Feiticeria
Knife Prty (for Select dates)
When Girls Telephone Boys (for Select dates)
Nosebleed
Engine No. 9
Be Quiet and Drive
RX Queen (for Select dates)
Hole in the Earth
Headup
Change (In the House of Flies)
7 Words

Stone Sour

30/30-150
Orchids
Reborn
Inhale
Come What(ever) May
Bother
Through Glass
Idle Hands
Hell & Consequences
Get Inside

Flyleaf

Besides the songs listed below, the band performed a cover of Pride (In the Name of Love) by the band U2 on a select date with Richard Patrick, as well as a cover of "Something I Can Never Have" by Nine Inch Nails.

Red Sam
Breathe Today
Fully Alive
I'm Sorry
I'm So Sick
So I Thought
Cassie

Dir en grey

The songs that Dir en grey played differed from each show (with the exception of the song G.D.S. being used to open each show), but these songs were played more frequently during the tour:

Merciless Cult
Ryoujoku no Ame,
Spilled Milk,
THE FATAL BELIEVER,
KODOKU NI SHISU YUENI KODOKU,
The Final,
dead tree,
THE IIID EMPIRE,
Clever Sleazoid.

These songs were played once or twice during the tour:
Saku,
C,
Child Prey,
Kasumi,
audience KILLER LOOP,
ITOSHISA HA FUHAI NITSUKI,
Jesus Christ R'n R,
KODOU,
Mr.NEWSMAN,
Beautiful Dirt,
HIGEKI WA MABUTA WO OROSHITA YASASHIKI UTSU.

Deadsy

Key to Gramercy Park
Le Cirque en Rose
Book of Black Dreams
Babes in Abyss
Carrying Over
Asura
Flowing Glower
Time
Tom Sawyer

CD and DVD release

The 2006 edition of Family Values Tour was highly successful and it was documented on separate CD and DVD releases, both of which were released on December 26, 2006 via Firm Music.

Dir en grey released a live DVD to their fan club entitled Despair in the Womb. The DVD featured a documentary of the tour on its second disc.

Dates

References

External links
 Official Family Values Tour website
 Official Family Values Tour 2006 game, Stage Sweeper
 Family Values Tour 2006 television advert
 Weather Cancels Family Values Show
 Trial Begins For Fan's Murder
 Man Near Death After Concert Melee

2006 concert tours
Family Values Tours
2006 in American music